Alessandro Tonelli (born 29 May 1992 in Brescia) is an Italian cyclist, who currently rides for UCI ProTeam . In May 2018, he was named in the startlist for the 2018 Giro d'Italia.

Major results

2010
 4th Memorial Davide Fardelli Juniors
2012
 4th Trofeo Franco Balestra
2013
 1st Gran Premio Carmine
 1st Trofeo Carla Bruno e Cadirola
 4th Gran Premio San Giuseppe
2014
 1st Trofeo Matteotti U23
 1st Gran Premio Sportivi di San Vigilio di Concesio
 1st Memorial Morgan Capretta
 2nd Industria del Premio of Garn Cuoio e delle Pelli
 3rd Giro del Montalbano
 8th GP Capodarco
2018
 1st Stage 4 Tour of Croatia
2021
 3rd Grand Prix Alanya
2022
 4th Grand Prix Alanya
2023
 8th Clàssica Comunitat Valenciana 1969
 8th Trofeo Serra de Tramuntana

Grand Tour general classification results timeline

References

External links

1992 births
Living people
Italian male cyclists
Cyclists from Brescia